U.S. Route 63 (US 63) is a highway in southeastern Minnesota that runs from the Minnesota-Iowa border south of Spring Valley to the Mississippi River at Red Wing. It connects the cities of Spring Valley, Stewartville, Rochester, and Lake City.

Route description
U.S. 63 enters the state in Fillmore County, just north of Chester, Iowa. It travels north to Spring Valley where it becomes concurrent with State Highway 16, following it west for five miles entering Mower County. It continues north through Racine, then into Stewartville, after passing into Olmsted County, where it becomes a divided highway. Immediately after Stewartville, it intersects Interstate 90, near Rochester International Airport. The highway then enters Rochester 1 mile after the I-90 junction, where it is an expressway south of U.S. 52 (slowly becoming a freeway). It then follows U.S. 52 west of downtown Rochester to 75th Street NW, where it departs from U.S. 52. It follows 75th Street eastward to Olmsted County 33, where it continues north from a roundabout.

It continues north through Olmsted and Wabasha counties. A short segment of the highway is built to four-lane expressway standards just north of Zumbro Falls. It meets U.S. Highway 61 at Lake City and overlaps it into the city of Red Wing. U.S. 63 turns off from U.S. 61 and then curves back northwest to cross over 61, and then reaches the Red Wing Bridge where it crosses the Mississippi River and enters the state of Wisconsin.

Nearly all of the route is legally defined as Constitutional Route 59 in the Minnesota Statutes, except for the part between Red Wing and the Mississippi River, which is Legislative Route 161.

History
U.S. 63 was extended into Minnesota in 1934. The route had previously been marked the year before as U.S. 59, except for the segment running from U.S. 61 to the river crossing, which had been State Highway 58. U.S. 63 was an original 1926 U.S. Route and terminated in Des Moines, Iowa until it was extended north. The U.S. 59 designation was simultaneously reassigned to a new highway running from Laredo, Texas to Pembina, North Dakota.  The  leg north of Rochester was originally blazed as the Lake City and Rochester Stage Road in 1858.

The route was paved when it was marked.

In the spring of 2014, it was rerouted to follow U.S. Highway 52 west of downtown Rochester. This makes the route longer, but reduces transit time due to higher speed limits and fewer traffic lights. The segment of the old route 63 between 37th Street NE and 75th Street NE was turned over to Olmsted County, and renamed County route 33. Plans for the change were announced in April, 2012.

Major intersections

Future
The Minnesota Department of Transportation also has plans to turn Highway 63 into a controlled-access freeway between U.S. 52 and Interstate 90.

References

External links

U.S. Highway 63 at the Unofficial Minnesota Highways Page

63
 Minnesota
Transportation in Fillmore County, Minnesota
Transportation in Mower County, Minnesota
Transportation in Olmsted County, Minnesota
Transportation in Wabasha County, Minnesota
Transportation in Goodhue County, Minnesota